Slavic Village Passentin  is an archaeological open-air museum located in the destination of Passentin in the land of Mecklenburg-Vorpommern in Germany. The museum is a research and educational establishment specializing in cultural and rural history. The main purpose of the work is dissemination of cultural and historical knowledge, to encourages the visitors to explore their roots, their own ethnic and cultural heritage. 
For a few hours or some days here school classes and families able to live and acted as the slavs in the Early Middle Ages: sleep, prepare food and even weaving, spinning, pottery, carving, forging.

History 

The Slavic Village PassentinJ, built 1994–1999 thanks to the engagement of Dorothee Rätsch, a local sculptor. In the near, in the area around the Tollensesee lake, probably  the location Rethra, the religious center of the West Slavs, and near Passentin during excavations has been found remnants of a Slavic  Lowland castle. Therefore, was chosen the place for the Slavic Village here.

Buildings 
This Rundling consisting of reconstructions of windowless post in ground huts ore houses based on archaeological sources from the Early Middle Ages.  
Several smaller and larger single-room houses are situated around a pond. The gatehouse is the only access through the picket fence that surrounds the village. A long house (8th-10th century) serves as a venue for 20-40 people. Construction: Wattle and daub, thatched roof

Workshops 
 Cooking house with dome oven, Construction: Half-timbered,  Wooden shingle roofs
 Baking house with Masonry oven
 Forge with two anvils and two flues
 Pottery House- drying room for pottery Construction: Pit-house, Sod roof
 Spinning and weaving house- serves to wool processing, Construction: Log house
 Bathhouse, Construction: Log house
 Hay hut, Construction: wattle walls (willow), thatched roof
 fairytale hut,  Construction: Wattle and daub, thatched roof
 joinery

Living huts 
 Beekeeper hut
 Herb Cottage 
 Shepherd's hut 
 Hunter's hut
 Fisherman's hut
 Broomsquire's hut
 Medicine hut

Specialized buildings 
 Sanitary building, the only modern building  
 Log house, currently used as an office
 Animal stalls- currently unused

See also 
 List of open-air museums in Germany

References

External links 

 Website of the Slavic Village
 Geschichte leben
 wild wurzeln - Verein für ganzheitliche Naturbildung e.V. 

Archaeological museums in Germany
Archaeological sites in Germany
Open-air museums in Germany
Tourist attractions in Mecklenburg-Western Pomerania